Oncidium deltoideum is a species of orchid found from southern Ecuador to northern Peru.

deltoideum